Sheys Rezaei Khonakdar (born 2 April 1984 in Sari, Iran) is an Iranian footballer and singer.

Club career
Sheys is originally from Hamid Abad (one of Sari's suburbs).
He has played most of his career for Persepolis and started to be known in 2005–06 season and became more famous after problems in 2007–08 season. He has featured in U17, U23 and the A team of Iran.  In June 2008 he was on trial with Bundesliga side VfB Stuttgart. He joined Saba Battery in August 2008. After spending one season with Saba and playing in the AFC Champions League he moved back to Persepolis. After completing the season with Persepolis in 2011–12, he was released by the club and joined the Azadegan League side, Shahrdari Tabriz.

Club career statistics

International career
He was a member of Iran national under-23 football team, participating in the 2006 Asian Games. In October 2006, he was called up to join senior Team Melli for the first time in an LG cup tournament held in Jordan. He made his debut for Iran on 4 October in a match against Iraq. He scored in his debut.

In June 2007, he was again called up to join the Iran squad in another tournament held in Jordan, where he helped Iran win the 2007 West Asian Football Federation Championship.
In March 2009 under Ali Daei he was called up again for Team Melli.

International goals 
Scores and results list Iran's goal tally first.

Honours

Club
Persepolis
Iran Pro League: 2007–08
Hazfi Cup: 2009–10, 2010–11

National
Iran U23
Asian Games Bronze Medal: 2006

References

External links
 Sheys Rezaei at PersianLeague.com
 
 video (YouTube)
 video  (YouTube)
 Players banned from Iranian league for ‘immoral’ butt grab celebrations yahoo

1984 births
Living people
Iranian footballers
Iran international footballers
Association football defenders
Saipa F.C. players
Persepolis F.C. players
Saba players
Asian Games bronze medalists for Iran
Asian Games medalists in football
Footballers at the 2006 Asian Games
Medalists at the 2006 Asian Games
People from Sari, Iran
Sportspeople from Sari, Iran